The 47th National Film Awards, presented by Directorate of Film Festivals, the organisation set up by Ministry of Information and Broadcasting, India to felicitate the best of Indian Cinema released in the year 1999. Ceremony took place on 18 September 2000 and awards were given by then President of India, K. R. Narayanan.

Awards 

Awards were divided into feature films, non-feature films and books written on Indian cinema.

Lifetime Achievement Award

Feature films 

Feature films were awarded at All India as well as regional level. For 47th National Film Awards, a Malayalam film, Vanaprastham won the National Film Award for Best Feature Film; whereas a Hindi film, Hum Dil De Chuke Sanam won the maximum number of awards (4). Following were the awards given in each category:

Juries 

A committee headed by Gautam Ghose was appointed to evaluate the feature films awards. Following were the jury members:

 Jury Members
 Gautam Ghose (Chairperson)Kalpana AgarwalSaeed Akhtar MirzaMohan SharmaG. V. G. RajuGautami
K. Ravindranathan NairSreelekha MukherjiT. S. NagabharanaK. Janaki RamLeslie CarvalhoMoloya Goswami
Arun KaulRatnottama SenguptaSanjeev BhargavaRam Gopal Bajaj

All India Award 

Following were the awards given:

Golden Lotus Award 

Official Name: Swarna Kamal

All the awardees are awarded with 'Golden Lotus Award (Swarna Kamal)', a certificate and cash prize.

Silver Lotus Award 

Official Name: Rajat Kamal

All the awardees are awarded with 'Silver Lotus Award (Rajat Kamal)', a certificate and cash prize.

Regional Awards 

The award is given to best film in the regional languages in India.

Non-Feature Films 

Short Films made in any Indian language and certified by the Central Board of Film Certification as a documentary/newsreel/fiction are eligible for non-feature film section.

Juries 

A committee headed by Jabbar Patel was appointed to evaluate the non-feature films awards. Following were the jury members:

 Jury Members
 Jabbar Patel (Chairperson)Malay BhattacharyaO. K. JohnyMeera DewanRashmi Doraiswamy

Golden Lotus Award 

Official Name: Swarna Kamal

All the awardees are awarded with 'Golden Lotus Award (Swarna Kamal)', a certificate and cash prize.

Silver Lotus Award 

Official Name: Rajat Kamal

All the awardees are awarded with 'Silver Lotus Award (Rajat Kamal)' and cash prize.

Best Writing on Cinema 

The awards aim at encouraging study and appreciation of cinema as an art form and dissemination of information and critical appreciation of this art-form through publication of books, articles, reviews etc.

Juries 

A committee headed by K. Satchidanandan was appointed to evaluate the writing on Indian cinema. Following were the jury members:

 Jury Members
 K. Satchidanandan (Chairperson)Deepa GahlotSiladitya Sen

Golden Lotus Award 

Official Name: Swarna Kamal

All the awardees are awarded with 'Golden Lotus Award (Swarna Kamal)' and cash prize.

Special Mention 

All the award winners are awarded with Certificate of Merit.

Awards not given 

Following were the awards not given as no film was found to be suitable for the award:

 Best Feature Film in English
 Best Non-Feature Film Direction
 Best Agricultural Film
 Best Exploration / Adventure Film
 Best Film on Family Welfare
 Best Feature Film in Manipuri
 Best Scientific Film
 Best Historical Reconstruction / Compilation Film
 Best Investigative Film
 Best Music Direction
 Best Feature Film in Punjabi
 Best Promotional Film
 Best Educational / Motivational / Instructional Film
 Best Animation Film

References

External links 
 National Film Awards Archives
 Official Page for Directorate of Film Festivals, India

National Film Awards (India) ceremonies
2000 Indian film awards